Michael Lysko is the former commissioner of the Canadian Football League. Hailing from Aylmer, Ontario and a graduate from the University of Waterloo, Lysko served as vice president of The Gem Group for three years until November 1, 2000, in which he signed a three-year contract worth $750,000, replacing Jeff Giles. Among the goals Lysko had was to bring an expansion team to Ottawa, which had not seen a CFL franchise since the Ottawa Rough Riders folded in 1996. On October 21, 2001, the Ottawa Renegades was formed, but instability in the franchise led to its folding in 2006. However, on March 20, 2002, Lysko was fired as commissioner after he made comments towards the Toronto Argonauts regarding their hiring of Garth Drabinsky as a consultant; the deal with Drabinsky, who had been under investigation for alleged fraud, was regarded by Lysko as a "deal with the devil." Argonauts owner Sherwood Schwarz called for Lysko's firing, and he was unanimously voted to be fired by the board of governors. Lysko had spent only 15 months as commissioner, and is the only commissioner in league history to be fired by the board.

After his firing, Lysko became the director of athletics at the University of Western Ontario, which included the renovations of TD Waterhouse Stadium, Alumni Hall and Thames Hall. However, Lysko left the position on July 20, 2007, citing his intentions to move close to his wife Kathryn's parents as among the reasons for his departure.

See also
 List of University of Waterloo people

References

Living people
University of Waterloo alumni
Canadian Football League commissioners
Academic staff of the University of Western Ontario
Year of birth missing (living people)